The 2011 LPGA of Japan Tour was the 44th season of the LPGA of Japan Tour, the professional golf tour for women operated by the Ladies Professional Golfers' Association of Japan. It consisted of 34 golf tournaments, all played in Japan. Four events were canceled due to the 2011 Tōhoku earthquake and tsunami. Ahn Sun-ju won four events and the Order of Merit title.

Tournament results

For the official tour schedule on the LPGA of Japan Tour's website, including links to full results, click here.

Events in bold are majors.

The Mizuno Classic is co-sanctioned with the LPGA Tour.

Leading money winners

There is a complete list on the official site here.

See also
2011 in golf

External links
 

LPGA of Japan Tour
LPGA of Japan Tour
LPGA of Japan Tour